Tabernaemontana pachysiphon grows as a shrub or small tree up to  tall, with a trunk diameter of up to . Its fragrant flowers feature white to pale yellow corolla lobes. Its habitat is forests from sea level to  altitude. Its numerous local medicinal uses include as a styptic, and as a treatment for headache, hypertension and to relieve cramps. The species is native to tropical Africa.

References

pachysiphon
Plants described in 1894
Plants used in traditional African medicine
Flora of Africa